Admiral Montgomery may refer to:

Sir Alexander Montgomery, 3rd Baronet (1807–1888), British Royan Navy admiral
Alfred E. Montgomery (1891–1961), U.S. Navy vice admiral
Charles Montgomery (Royal Navy officer) (born 1955), British Royal Navy vice admiral
John B. Montgomery (1794–1872), U.S. Navy rear admiral

See also
John Eglinton Montgomerie (1825–1902), British Royan Navy admiral
Robert Archibald James Montgomerie (1855–1908), British Royal Navy rear admiral